Gao Wen (born 18 January 1985) is a former Chinese-born Hong Kong professional footballer who played as a midfielder. He is currently a coach of Hong Kong Premier League club Kitchee.

References

1985 births
Living people
Chinese footballers
Hong Kong footballers
Chinese expatriate footballers
Hong Kong international footballers
Association football midfielders
Hong Kong First Division League players
Hong Kong Premier League players
Kitchee SC players
Resources Capital FC players